William Vollie Alexander Jr. (born January 16, 1934) is a retired American politician who represented the U.S. state of Arkansas in the United States House of Representatives from 1969 to 1993, rising to the post of Chief Deputy Majority Whip.

Early life and education
Alexander was born in Memphis, Tennessee to Spencer (née Buck) and William Vollie  Alexander He grew up in Osceola, Arkansas, graduating from Osceola High School in 1951, and became an Eagle Scout the same year.

He attended the  University of Arkansas at Fayetteville, where he was a member of Kappa Sigma Fraternity, before earning a B.A. from Southwestern at Memphis University (now Rhodes College) in 1957 and a LL.B from Vanderbilt University Law School in Nashville in 1960.

Career
He subsequently clerked for Judge Marion S. Boyd of the United States District Court for the Western District of Tennessee. He served in the U.S. Army JAG Corps.

Alexander practiced law in Memphis and Osceola, was a commissioner on the Arkansas Waterways Commission, and secretary of the Osceola Port Authority. He was elected as a Democrat from Arkansas's 1st congressional district in 1968, succeeding thirty-year incumbent Ezekiel C. "Took" Gathings, who retired, and would subsequently be reelected eleven additional time. In the House, he served in the Democratic leadership as Chief Deputy Majority Whip from 1981 to 1987, and was a member of the House Appropriations Committee, where he was active on issues involving agriculture, energy and foreign trade.

In 1992, the Arkansas Democrat-Gazette published a story accusing Alexander of misusing campaign funds, although these transactions were later found to be legal. Nonetheless, he was defeated for re-nomination by a wide margin by Blanche Lambert (later to be known as Blanche Lincoln), a former staff assistant to Alexander, who went on to win the general election in November.

Alexander and his wife, Debi Alexander, today live in Reston, Virginia. They have two children, William Phillips Alexander and Ashely Semmes Alexander.

References

External links

 

|-

|-

1934 births
20th-century American lawyers
20th-century American politicians
American Episcopalians
Arkansas lawyers
Christians from Arkansas
United States Army Judge Advocate General's Corps
Living people
Democratic Party members of the United States House of Representatives from Arkansas
Military personnel from Arkansas
Military personnel from Tennessee
People from Osceola, Arkansas
People from Warrenton, Virginia
Politicians from Memphis, Tennessee
Rhodes College alumni
United States Army officers
University of Arkansas alumni
Vanderbilt University Law School alumni
Members of Congress who became lobbyists